The Museo Storico Navale is a naval history museum located in the Castello district of Venice, near the Venetian Arsenal. The museum was established by the Regia Marina (the Italian Royal Navy) in 1919. Its collections include items relating to the naval and maritime history of Venice, and it has a large number of ship models and weapons on display.

External links

References

Museums in Venice
Museums established in 1919
Italian Navy
Maritime museums in Italy
Naval museums